Siddharth (Sid) Katragadda is an Indian American writer, filmmaker, playwright, poet, artist and engineer.

Early life
He was born in Bangalore, India, and moved to America for his Master's degree in computer sciences from the University of Texas at Arlington.

Films
Katragadda's short documentary "B.L.I.N.D - Born to Live in Near Darkness?" had its theatrical release at the Los Feliz 3 Theater, Los Angeles, from Sept 24-30th 2021. The film was an official entry to the 94th Academy Awards in the Documentary Short-Subject Category.

His short film "Varanasi" won the Best Foreign Film Award at the Atlantic City CineFest, New Jersey, 2013. His screenplay "Painless" (aka The Mercy Machine) was a quarter finalist at the PAGE International Screenwriting Awards, 2016, the Screencraft Drama Contest 2017, the WeScreenplay Screenplay Awards His short documentary "The Indus Code" was shortlisted for the 6th International Documentary and Short Film Festival, Kerala. 
 His Screenplay pitches won Honorable Mention/Finalist awards at the 2021 ISA Virtual Pitch Challenge.

Filmography

Writing 
His first novel, "Metamorphosis" won Runners-up Prize at the 2021 Red Hen Press Fiction Award/ Los Angeles Review. 
 
His first Novel in Verse, Dark Rooms won an award at the San Diego Book Prize, 2002 (Poetry). A sequel, The Other Wife also won the same award in 2003.

Numerous articles written by him have been published on CNN.

His work has appeared in Taint Taint Taint,Grey Sparrow Press (best new literary journal 2011), New Plains Review - Fall 2018 Issue, Chaffey Review, A Generation Defining Itself, Carter Street Review, Wilderness Review and numerous literary journals. His work has been reviewed in the journals like "One India." 
 His quotes have been published by various websites, and he's most renowned for his quote "The greatness of a culture can be found in its festivals." He also writes on Cricket topics.

Books

Plays 

An emerging playwright, his play "Tsunami" was produced by Firecracker Production, Houston, and was nominated for five Awards at the 2021 Broadway World Houston. Tsunami also was won the "Your Worst Nightmare Short Play Festival" in San Francisco. His short play Power Outage will be produced at the 11th Towne Street Theatre's Annual Ten-Minute Play Festival - at the Stella Adler Theatre, Hollywood April 4–26, 2020.

Theatre productions

Painting
An emerging artist/painter and is known for his abstract portraits of Indian women. He has held various exhibitions in India and in America. He believes that an artist's primary objective should be to capture a culture – and that a culture, or ethnicity, can be best understood through its women (because society shapes its women). He paints colorful and elaborately dressed, voluptuous, dark Indian women - paying equal attention to their omnipresent bindis and resplendent ornaments as he does to their vibrant draped saris and brilliant blouses. He is the founder of the 'Soulism' art style and variuous other styles. His art has been featured in journals like taint taint taint and 'Artists of India.

Exhibitions

Family tree 

 T. Ramaswamy Choudary
Tripuraneni Gopichand
Tripuraneni Sai Chand (Actor)
Rajani Katragadda (Writer)
Gopichand Katragadda (Former CTO Tata Sons)
Siddharth_Katragadda

References

1972 births
Living people
American male novelists
American people of Kannada descent
Writers from Bangalore
English-language writers from India
American film producers
American male screenwriters
English-language film directors
Indian film directors
Telugu film directors
Tamil film directors
American film directors of Indian descent
Science fiction film directors
Horror film directors
American male writers of Indian descent
Indian emigrants to the United States
People from Andhra Pradesh
20th-century Indian painters
21st-century Indian painters
Indian male painters
20th-century American dramatists and playwrights
20th-century Indian male artists
21st-century Indian male artists
People from Bangalore